Garuda Visnu Kencana statue (also known as GWK statue) is a 122-meter tall statue located in Garuda Wisnu Kencana Cultural Park, Bali, Indonesia. It was designed by Nyoman Nuarta and inaugurated in September 2018. The statue was designed to be Indonesia’s tallest statue, and is inspired by an event that finds its roots in Hinduism  about Garuda's search for Amrita, the elixir of life. According to this story, Garuda agreed to be ridden by Vishnu in return for the right to use the elixir to liberate his enslaved mother. The monument was completed on 31 July 2018 and inaugurated by Indonesian President Joko Widodo on 22 September 2018. It is the tallest statue of a Hindu deity and the tallest statue in Indonesia.

History
It took twenty-eight years and around $100 million to build the statue. GWK was designed in 1990 by Nyoman Nuarta under the then-Tourism Minister Joop Ave, Energy Minister Ida Bagus Sudjana and Governor of Bali Ida Bagus Oka. The groundbreaking event of the statue’s construction took place 1997. In the late 1990s, the project was halted due to the 1997 Asian financial crisis. 

Construction resumed in 2013 after a sixteen year hiatus, when property developer PT. Alam Sutera Realty Tbk (ASR) agreed to financing the construction of the statue and the project. The idea for the monument was not without controversy; religious authorities on the island complained that its massive size might disrupt the spiritual balance of the island, and that its commercial nature was inappropriate, but some groups agree with the project, because it will be a new tourist attraction.

Fabrication and dimensions
The statue was assembled in Bali from 754 discrete modules that were constructed in Bandung, West Java and then transported to the work site. The modules were cut into 1,500 smaller pieces to accommodate the cranes maximum load. The last piece that was placed onto the gigantic artwork was at its tail, which is located at the highest point of the statue. Garuda's shape is so complex that engineers have designed special joints in the supporting structure, with up to 11 enormous steel girders coming together at the same point, whereas normal construction joints have four or six girders. The Garuda Wisnu Kencana statue is designed to withstand storms and earthquakes, and expected to last for the next 100 years.

The completed monument is about 21-storeys tall. It weighs 4000 tonnes, making it the heaviest statue in Indonesia. The artwork is made of copper and brass supported by 21,000 steel bars, 170,000 bolts. The statue is made of copper and brass sheeting, with a stainless steel frame and skeleton, as well as a steel and concrete core column. The outer covering measures  in area. The crown of Vishnu is covered with golden mosaics and the statue has a dedicated lighting arrangement. The sculpture sits atop a building base which will function as a restaurant, museum, and viewing gallery.

See also 
 List of tallest statues

References

Hindu gods in art
Buildings and structures in Bali
Tourist attractions in Bali
Garuda Wisnu Kencana
2018 establishments in Indonesia